Australian Convict Sites is a World Heritage property consisting of 11 remnant penal sites originally built within the British Empire during the 18th and 19th centuries on fertile Australian coastal strips at Sydney, Tasmania, Norfolk Island, and Fremantle; now representing "...the best surviving examples of large-scale convict transportation and the colonial expansion of European powers through the presence and labour of convicts."

These properties were all individually included on the Australian National Heritage List before inclusion on the World Heritage list.

Preparations began in 1995, and a World Heritage nomination was first made in January 2008. That attempt failed, and the nomination was subsequently reworked.

Penal sites included

The 11 penal sites constituting the Australian Convict Sites World Heritage listed property are:

Kingston and Arthur's Vale Historic Area ("KAVHA"), Norfolk Island.
Old Government House and Domain ("Old Government House"), New South Wales.
Hyde Park Barracks, New South Wales.
Brickendon and Woolmers Estates ("Brickendon-Woolmers"), Tasmania.
Darlington Probation Station ("Darlington"), Tasmania.
Old Great North Road, New South Wales.
Cascades Female Factory ("Cascades"), Tasmania.
Port Arthur Historic Site ("Port Arthur"), Tasmania.
Coal Mines Historic Site ("Coal Mines"), Tasmania.
Cockatoo Island Convict Site ("Cockatoo Island"), New South Wales.
Fremantle Prison, Western Australia.

Criteria for listing
Out of over 3,000 convict sites remaining in Australia, the 11 constituting the Australian Convict Sites were selected as the pre-eminent examples of the world's convict era satisfying World Heritage selection criteria IV & VI, as follows:

References

 
Australian National Heritage List